Thuya Garden is a semi-formal herbaceous garden, in the style of Gertrude Jekyll, located at 15 Thuya Drive, Northeast Harbor, Maine. It is open daily from May through October.

The garden is located on the grounds of Thuya Lodge, built between 1912 and 1916 for Boston landscape architect Joseph Henry Curtis. At that time, today's garden was an orchard. After Curtis' death in 1928, Thuya Lodge and its grounds were placed in a trust directed by his friend Charles K. Savage, an heir of the nearby Asticou Inn and creator of the Asticou Azalea Garden. Today's greatly expanded garden was originally conceived in 1933 by Savage, and built from 1956 to 1961 with plants from Beatrix Farrand's Reef Point Garden in Bar Harbor when that estate was dismantled in 1956, and with financial help from John D. Rockefeller Jr. It opened to the public in 1962.

The garden is laid out as a narrow lawn axis with cross-axes, edged by a rustic pavilion to its north and a shallow reflecting pool to the south. Flower beds contain about half perennials and half annuals, with plantings of rhododendrons and mountain laurels.

References 
 The Grand Masters of Maine Gardening, Jane Lamb, Down East Books, 2004, pages 40-44. .
 Gardens of Eden: Among the World's Most Beautiful Gardens, Holly Kerr Forsyth, The Miegunyah Press, 2009, pages 62-65. .
 The Cultural Landscape Foundation entry
 Land & Garden Preserve entry
 Acadia National Park entry
 AcadiaMagic entry

Gardens in Maine
Northeast Harbor, Maine